Cambridge Regional College Football Club was a football club based in Cambridge, England. The club were members of the Eastern Counties League Premier Division and played at the Abbey Stadium.

History
The club was formed for the start of the 2006–07 season acting as a feeder club, youth academy and reserve team for Cambridge United. Although all players were officially registered as Cambridge Regional College players, many were also part of Cambridge United's Youth Academy, and transfer rules allowed first team players for Cambridge United to move on loan throughout the season.

The club started 2006–07 in the Eastern Counties League Premier Division, inheriting the position previously occupied by Cambridge City reserves. They finished runners-up in 2008–09 and again in 2009–10.

In January 2014 it was announced that the club would be disbanded at the end of the 2013–14 season. The club folded in May, but its youth development system will continue to function.

Club records
Highest league position: Eastern Counties League Premier Division, 2nd, 2008–09, 2009–10

See also
Cambridge Regional College F.C. players

References

Defunct football clubs in England
Association football clubs established in 2006
Sport in Cambridge
Eastern Counties Football League
2006 establishments in England
Defunct football clubs in Cambridgeshire
Association football clubs disestablished in 2014
2014 disestablishments in England
Cambridge United F.C.